Ognjen Krasić (born 9 April 1988) is a Serbian footballer.

Career
In February 2016, Krasić signed for FK Voždovac.

On 26 July 2018, FC Banants announced that Krasić had left the club following the expiration of his contract.

References

External links
 
 Ognjen Krasić stats at utakmica.rs 
 
 

1988 births
Living people
Sportspeople from Zrenjanin
Association football midfielders
Serbian footballers
Serbian expatriate footballers
FK Proleter Zrenjanin players
FK Vojvodina players
FK Palić players
FK Sloboda Tuzla players
FK Proleter Novi Sad players
FK Voždovac players
FC Urartu players
FC Taraz players
FC Nasaf players
FK Inđija players
Serbian First League players
Serbian SuperLiga players
Kazakhstan Premier League players
Uzbekistan Super League players
Armenian Premier League players
Premier League of Bosnia and Herzegovina players
Serbian expatriate sportspeople in Armenia
Serbian expatriate sportspeople in Kazakhstan
Serbian expatriate sportspeople in Bosnia and Herzegovina
Serbian expatriate sportspeople in Uzbekistan
Expatriate footballers in Armenia
Expatriate footballers in Kazakhstan
Expatriate footballers in Bosnia and Herzegovina
Expatriate footballers in Uzbekistan